is the seventeenth installment in the popular Kamen Rider Series of tokusatsu programs. As part of the series, several musical releases through Avex Mode were made for the series opening themes, ending themes, image songs, and original soundtracks. Most songs are rearrangements of the initial opening and ending themes.

Climax Jump

Lyrics: 
Composition & Arrangement: Shuhei Naruse
Artist: AAA DEN-O form
Episodes: 1-39, 46

"Climax Jump" (released March 21, 2007) was performed by AAA under the name "AAA DEN-O form". The other "edits" of "Climax Jump" that were released on the single were used as background music for the series. It debuted at #5 on the Oricon weekly charts, becoming the first of AAA's singles to reach the top five of the charts. It was also certified by the Recording Industry Association of Japan as a Gold Record in March 2008, one year after the release.

For the introduction of Climax Form in episode 28, "Climax Jump" was used as the ending theme. In the finale, the instrumental version of "Climax Jump" was used as a true ending theme, playing over the end credits, instead of over the battle.

"Climax Jump" was later released on the Kamen Rider Decade album Masked Rider series Theme song Re-Product CD SONG ATTACK RIDE Third featuring DEN-O KABUTO HIBIKI, where it was rearranged by both RIDER CHIPS and Shuhei Naruse.

HIPHOP ver.
Lyrics: Shoko Fujibayashi
Composition, Arrangement, & Remix: Shuhei Naruse
Artist: AAA Den-O form
Episodes: 13-16, I'm Born!, 37, Climax Deka
This version of "Climax Jump" plays when Ryutaros takes over Ryotaro and he is accompanied by his "dancers" until "Double-Action Gun form" was recorded and used in its place in episode 21. It was played in the movie when R-Ryotaro arrived at the Climax Scene.

DEN-LINER form
Lyrics: Shoko Fujibayashi
Composition: Shuhei Naruse
Arrangement: LOVE+HATE
Artist: Momotaros, Urataros, Kintaros, Ryutaros (Toshihiko Seki, Kōji Yusa, Masaki Terasoma, Kenichi Suzumura)
Episodes: 40-45, 47-48, Climax Deka

"Climax Jump DEN-LINER form" (released December 19, 2007) is an arrangement of "Climax Jump" that has Momotaros, Urataros, Kintaros, and Ryutaros singing. It was used as the opening theme song starting on episode 40. The single for the song had four different CD jackets for each of the four Tarōs. This designated what bonus track (a remix of "Climax Jump" named after the Imagin's catchphrase) would be found on the disc (the "Ore, Sanjō!" remix, the "Tsuraretemiru?" remix, the "Nakerude" remix, and the "Kotae wa Kiitenai!" remix).

In its first week, the "Climax Jump DEN-LINER form" single sold 66,000 records, reaching #2 on the Oricon Styles weekly album rankings, higher than any previous Kamen Rider Series single. It reached #62 on 2008 Yearly singles Oricon chart. It also was certified as a Gold Record by the RIAJ.

Dark HIPHOP ver.
Lyrics: Shoko Fujibayashi
Composition, Arrangement, & Remix: Shuhei Naruse
Artist: AAA Den-O form
Episodes: 37
This version of "Climax Jump" plays when Kai arrives and takes control of people.

pop'n form
An arrangement of "Climax Jump" entitled "Climax Jump pop'n form" appears in the arcade game pop'n music 16 PARTY♪ and is performed entirely by Shuhei Naruse.

Climax Jump the Final
Lyrics: Shoko Fujibayashi
Composition & Arrangement: Shuhei Naruse
Guitar: AYANO (of FULL AHEAD)
Artist: AAA DEN-O form
"Climax Jump the Final" is a new arrangement of "Climax Jump" recorded for Saraba Kamen Rider Den-O: Final Countdown. It was included on the album Ī jan! Ī jan! Sugē jan!?.

Cho Climax Jump
Lyrics: Shoko Fujibayashi
Composition & Arrangement: Shuhei Naruse
Artist: : Momotaros (Toshihiko Seki), Urataros (Kōji Yusa), Kintaros (Masaki Terasoma), Ryutaros (Kenichi Suzumura), Teddy (Daisuke Ono), the Owner (Kenjirō Ishimaru), Kotaro Nogami (Dori Sakurada), Naomi (Rina Akiyama), and Kohana (Tamaki Matsumoto)
 is a new arrangement of "Climax Jump" recorded for Cho Kamen Rider Den-O & Decade Neo Generations: The Onigashima Warship, released on April 22, 2009.

Climax Jump for U
Artist: Momotaros, Urataros, Kintaros, Ryutaros, Deneb, Sieg, Teddy (Toshihiko Seki, Kōji Yusa, Masaki Terasoma, Kenichi Suzumura, Hōchū Ōtsuka, Shin-ichiro Miki,  Daisuke Ono)

"Climax Jump for U" is the latest rearrangement of "Climax Jump" that was performed on the Imagin stage tour Imagin Super Climax Tour 2010. The song is to first be included on a series of CDs released with purchases of tickets of the show as a "Sampler Size edit" coupled with one of the four main "Double-Action" variations, with its full size version and seven variations included on the Cho CD-Box.

Double-Action
The "Double-Action" line of songs are (initially) a series of duets sung by Ryotaro Nogami and his Imagin partners (actor Takeru Satoh and the voice actor for the Imagin) and are used as the ending theme or the song played in the background of climactic scenes whenever that Imagin's form of Den-O is used. Every CD that a "Double-Action" song is released on also features a version of the song with sound bites of the character's dialogue throughout the song.

Sword form
Lyrics: Shoko Fujibayashi
Composition & Arrangement: LOVE+HATE
Artist: Ryotaro Nogami & Momotaros (Takeru Satoh & Toshihiko Seki)
Episodes: 3-7, 10-11, 14, 16, 18-19, 23, 33, 41, Climax Deka
"Double-Action Sword form" features the Imagin Momotaros (Toshihiko Seki) as Ryotaro's singing partner and is sung in a Eurobeat style.

Rod form
Lyrics: Shoko Fujibayashi
Composition: LOVE+HATE
Arrangement: 
Artist: Ryotaro Nogami & Urataros (Takeru Satoh & Kōji Yusa)
Episodes: 8-9, 15, 22, 44, Climax Deka
"Double-Action Rod form" features the Imagin Urataros (Kōji Yusa) as Ryotaro's singing partner and has a ska beat.

Ax form
Lyrics: Shoko Fujibayashi
Composition: LOVE+HATE, Shuhei Naruse
Arrangement: Shuhei Naruse
Artist: Ryotaro Nogami & Kintaros (Takeru Satoh & Masaki Terasoma)
Episodes: 15, 24, 31, 40, 44, Climax Deka
"Double-Action Ax form" features the Imagin Kintaros (Masaki Terasoma) in the duet singing in an enka style.

Gun form
Lyrics: Shoko Fujibayashi
Composition: LOVE+HATE, Shuhei Naruse
Arrangement: Shuhei Naruse
Artist: Ryotaro Nogami & Ryutaros (Takeru Satoh & Kenichi Suzumura)
Episodes: 17, 21, 23, 26, 44, Climax Deka
"Double-Action Gun form" replaces "Climax Jump HIPHOP ver." as the song that plays whenever Ryutaros (Kenichi Suzumura) is in control of Ryotaro and sings in the duet with him. It is sung in a hip hop style.

Wing form
Lyrics: Shoko Fujibayashi
Composition: LOVE+HATE
Arrangement: Shuhei Naruse
Artist: Ryotaro Nogami & Sieg (Takeru Satoh & Shin-ichiro Miki)
Episodes: 49 (Finale), I'm Born! Final Cut Version
"Double-Action Wing form" was featured in the finale episode and has an Arabic pop style. During the ending credits of the finale, the song was accidentally titled "Climax Jump Wing form". Toei later released a statement correcting this error in the Den-O production blog and that a single for "Double-Action Wing form" would be released on March 26, 2008. On its first day on the market, the single for "Double-Action Wing form" started out at #2 on the Oricon. It ended its first week at #5 on the Oricon's weekly charts. "Double-Action Wing form" later was used in the Final Cut Version of Kamen Rider Den-O: I'm Born!, the DVD of which also included a CD with the song and a version of the song featuring Sieg's dialogue from the movie.

Piano form
Composition: LOVE+HATE
Episodes: 33-34
"Double-Action Piano form (1-4)" is an instrumental version of "Double-Action" played on a grand piano as part of the storyline to episodes 33 and 34. The various versions of "Double-Action Piano form" were released on the "Real-Action" and "Double-Action Coffee form" singles.

Coffee form
Lyrics: Shoko Fujibayashi
Composition: LOVE+HATE, Shuhei Naruse
Arrangement: Shuhei Naruse
Artist: Naomi & Airi Nogami (Rina Akiyama & Wakana Matsumoto)
Episodes: 36
"Double-Action Coffee form" is the first "Double-Action" arrangement that is not used as an ending theme, but as an insert song, as both characters who sing the song are non-combatants. This song and "Real-Action" were released as singles on September 26, 2007. As a version of "Double-Action", it has a J-pop style.

GAOH form
Lyrics: Shoko Fujibayashi
Composition: LOVE+HATE, Shuhei Naruse
Arrangement: Shuhei Naruse
Artist: Kamen Rider Gaoh (Hiroyuki Watanabe)
Episodes: I'm Born! Final Cut Version
"Double-Action GAOH form" is an arrangement of "Double-Action" that is the only solo act with a deathrock feel that was released on the original soundtrack for Kamen Rider Den-O: I'm Born!, but was not used in the theatrical release of the film. It was later used on the DVD release's Final Cut Version and used as an "ending theme" for Kamen Rider Gaoh.

CLIMAX form
 Lyrics: Shoko Fujibayashi
 Composition: LOVE+HATE, Shuhei Naruse
 Arrangement: Shuhei Naruse
 Artist: Momotaros, Urataros, Kintaros, Ryutaros, Deneb (Toshihiko Seki, Kōji Yusa, Masaki Terasoma, Kenichi Suzumura, Hōchū Ōtsuka)
"Double-Action CLIMAX form" is an arrangement of "Double-Action" that is the only quintet vocalist arrangement. Its single was released on April 16, 2008. Shuhei Naruse arranged and composed the song. Like "Climax Jump DEN-LINER form", the single has variant covers which designate its bonus track (the song's rap being sung by the Imagin on the cover). These singles also include a DVD of the music video. A sixth single has all five Imagin on the cover, but does not have a bonus track nor a DVD. On its first day of release, the singles reached #3 on the Oricon Daily charts. It ended its first week on the Oricon at #4 on the Weekly Single Charts.

Strike form
Lyrics: Shoko Fujibayashi
Composition: LOVE+HATE
Arrangement: Ryo (of defspiral)
Artist: Kotaro Nogami & Teddy (Dori Sakurada & Daisuke Ono)
"Double-Action Strike form" is a rock arrangement of "Double-Action" that serves as the theme song for Kamen Rider New Den-O. Its premiere is in the film Episode Blue: The Dispatched Imagin is Newtral.

Other songs
In addition to the "Climax Jump" and "Double-Action" remixes, there were several songs released that were original compositions for Den-O.

Action-ZERO

Lyrics: Shoko Fujibayashi
Composition & Arrangement: LOVE+HATE
Artist: Yuto Sakurai & Deneb (Yuichi Nakamura & Hōchū Ōtsuka)
Episodes: 25, 27, 32, 35, 37, 46, Climax Deka
"Action-ZERO" has a heavy metal style. It is the first ending theme that is not a "Double-Action" arrangement. However, it is still a duet between Yuto Sakurai and Deneb, and is used as the theme song for Kamen Rider Zeronos. A piano arrangement titled "Action-ZERO Piano form" was included as a B-side on the "Double-Action Wing form" single.

2010
Lyrics: Shoko Fujibayashi
Composition: LOVE+HATE
Arrangement: Shuhei Naruse
"Action-ZERO 2010" is a balladic arrangement of "Action-ZERO" that is used as the theme song for the film Episode Red: Zero no Star Twinkle. The single includes solo renditions by Yuichi Nakamura as Yuto Sakurai and Hōchū Ōtsuka as Deneb.

Yume de Aeta nara...
Lyrics, Composition, & Arrangement: 
Artist: 175R
 is the second song for Den-O that was commissioned by an artist who was not a member of the series' cast. The song by 175R was used as the theme song for the film Kamen Rider Den-O: I'm Born!.

Real-Action
Lyrics: Shoko Fujibayashi
Composition & Arrangement: Ryo (of defspiral)
Artist: Ryotaro Nogami (Takeru Satoh)
Episodes: 36, 38-39, 42, 45, Climax Deka
"Real-Action" has a rock style. It is the second ending theme that is not a "Double-Action" arrangement and is used as an ending theme for Kamen Rider Den-O Liner Form (the only form that Ryotaro fights by himself).

Den-O vocal tracks liner
It features remixes of "Double-Action", "Double-Action Rod form", "Double-Action Ax form", "Double-Action Gun form", "Double-Action Coffee form", "Double-Action GAOH form", "Action-ZERO", "Real-Action", and "Climax Jump DEN-LINER form".

Climax-Action
Lyrics: Shoko Fujibayashi
Composition: Shuhei Narusei & LOVE+HATE
Arrangement: LOVE+HATE
Artists included: AAA DEN-O form, Ryotaro Nogami (Takeru Satoh), Momotaros (Toshihiko Seki), Urataros (Kōji Yusa), Kintaros (Masaki Terasoma), Ryutaros (Kenichi Suzumura), Airi (Wakana Matsumoto), Naomi (Rina Akiyama), Sieg (Shin-ichiro Miki), Yuto Sakurai (Yuichi Nakamura), Deneb (Hōchū Ōtsuka)
 is a new song to serve as the theme for Episode Yellow: Treasure de End Pirates. The song is a medley of all of the "Climax Jump", the "Double-Action" songs (without "CLIMAX form" or "Strike form"), and "Action-ZERO"; sung portions of "GAOH form" and "Real-Action" are omitted, but instrumental portions from their songs are included. The B-side for its CD single is Kamen Rider Diend's theme: "Treasure Sniper" by Daiki Kaito (Kimito Totani). This medley is sung in an orchestra.

Albums
Several albums were released for Kamen Rider Den-O, mostly original soundtracks for the series and films.

Original Soundtrack
The  was released on June 27, 2007, and features the musical score for the first half of the series, "Climax Jump HIPHOP ver.", and TV size versions of "Climax Jump" and all four "Double-Action" renditions featured in the series up to the album's release.

Perfect-Action ~Double-Action Complete Collection~
Perfect-Action ~Double-Action Complete Collection~ (released on August 1, 2007) features "Double-Action", "Rod form", "Ax form", "Gun form", versions containing dialogue for all characters (including a new version for "Double-Action"), instrumentals for all four tracks, and the bonus track "Double-Action Bonus form" which is a short version of "Double-Action" with original dialogue for all four Imagin.

I'm Born! Original Soundtrack
The  was released on October 24, 2007, and features "Double-Action GAOH form" and its dialogue version as part of the film's soundtrack.

Original Soundtrack Vol.2
The  was released on December 19, 2007, and features "DEN-O VOCAL TRACKS LINER (C-J D-A nonstop re-connection)" as a track as well as the soundtrack for the latter half of the series.

Complete CD Box
The  was a box set released on January 16, 2008, that featured every song released for Kamen Rider Den-O up until that date, a total of 120 tracks. The box set includes "Climax Jump Dark HIPHOP ver.", the instrumental for "Double-Action GAOH form", and a series of soundbyte versions of the four primary "Double-Action" variations initially released as ringtones.

Imagin Absurd Card Game
 was a drama CD released on January 24, 2008, with artwork in the style of the Imagin Anime DVDs.

Play with the Imagin!
 is another drama CD that has the listener play games with the Imagin.

Ī jan! Ī jan! Sugē jan!?
 is an album, released on October 1, 2008, that features the release of "Climax Jump the Final", as well as rearrangements of "Climax Jump" titled "Climax Jump Sword form", "Climax Jump Rod form", "Climax Jump Ax form", "Climax Jump Gun form" (all of which also had dialogue versions), and "Climax Jump Piano form". Two versions of the album were released, one of which had a DVD with music videos for all of the "form" variations of "Climax Jump" included on the album.

Radi-Taros
The  Internet radio albums featured recordings of "web radio" shows hosted by the cast. Two CDs were released on November 12, 2008, under this title.

Final Countdown Original Soundtrack
The  was released on November 26, 2008, and featured "Climax Jump the Final" and the score for the film.

The Onigashima Warship Original Soundtrack
The  was released on October 21, 2009, and features the score for the film and "Cho Climax Jump".

Cho-Den-O Trilogy Original Soundtrack
The  is to be released on May 26, 2010, and features the score for all three films in the Kamen Rider × Kamen Rider × Kamen Rider The Movie: Cho-Den-O Trilogy series.

Cho CD-Box
The  was released on July 28, 2010. It consists of 20 CDs and 2 DVDs, containing a total of 350 songs, one of which is the new song "Climax Jump for U".

References

External links
Kamen Rider Den-O at Avex Mode
Kamen Rider Den-O music listings at mu-mo.net

Den-O discography
Film and television discographies